Music of the Spheres is the third solo album released by Ian Brown, the ex-frontman of The Stone Roses. It employs minimalist song structures with tracks like "Hear No See No" and "El mundo pequeño", sung in Spanish. The song "Whispers" won Muso's 2002 award for Best Single.  The Canadian edition of the album omits Track 5, "Hear No See No".

Track listing

Japanese Edition (UICP 1021) Bonus Tracks:

Personnel
Ian Brown - vocals
Dave Colquhoun (track: 1), Dave McCracken (track: 4), Francis Dunnery (track: 1-9), Tim Wills (tracks: 6, 9) - guitar
Dave McCracken (tracks: 4, 6), Francis Dunnery (track: 6), Matt Pegg (tracks: 5, 7, 9) - bass guitar
Dave McCracken (tracks: 1 to 9), Mark Sayfritz (track: 4) - keyboards, programming
Inder "Goldfinger" Matharu - percussion (tracks: 7, 9)
Dan Liebermann, Francis Dunnery (track: 5) - backing vocals
Anthony Pleeth, Bill Hawkes, Boguslaw Kostecki, David Daniels, David Woodcock, Dermot Crehan, Emlyn Singleton, Everton Nelson, Frank Schaefer, Helen Hathorn, Jackie Shave, Maciej Rakowski, Mark Berrow, Martin Loveday, Mary Scully, Miffy Hirsch, Patrick Kiernan, Patrick Lannigan, Perry Montague-Mason, Philip Dukes, Philippa Ibbotson, Rita Manning - strings (tracks: 1, 9)
Cathy Thompson - string arrangements (tracks: 1, 9)

References

2001 albums
Ian Brown albums
Polydor Records albums